Abioye is a surname. Notable people with the surname include:

Abiodun Abioye (born 1992), Nigerian cricketer
Akeem Abioye (born 1998), Nigerian footballer
David Abioye, Nigerian Christian author and preacher
Samson Abioye (1991–2017), Nigerian computer programmer and internet entrepreneur
Taiwo Abioye (born 1958), Nigerian English professor and academic administrator